The third Hawke ministry (Labor) was the 56th ministry of the Government of Australia. It was led by the country's 23rd Prime Minister, Bob Hawke. The third Hawke ministry succeeded the second Hawke ministry, which dissolved on 24 July 1987 following the federal election that took place on 11 July. The ministry was replaced by the fourth Hawke ministry on 4 April 1990 following the 1990 federal election.

Cabinet

Outer ministry

See also
 First Hawke ministry
 Second Hawke ministry
 Fourth Hawke ministry

Notes

Ministries of Elizabeth II
1987 establishments in Australia
1990 disestablishments in Australia
Hawke, 3
Australian Labor Party ministries
Ministry, Hawke 3
Cabinets established in 1987
Cabinets disestablished in 1990